This is the discography of Kaithapram Damodaran Namboothiri.

As a Composer

As Director

As Actor

*He has played the character of a classical or semi-classical singer/lyricsist in most of these films.

References 

Indian filmographies